The 1924–25 Rugby Football League season was the 30th season of rugby league football.

Season summary

Hull Kingston Rovers won their second Championship by defeating Swinton in the play-off final.

Swinton had ended the regular season as league leaders.

Oldham defeated Hull Kingston Rovers to win the Challenge Cup.

Swinton won the Lancashire League, and Hull Kingston Rovers won the Yorkshire League. Oldham beat St. Helens Recs 10–0 to win the Lancashire Cup, and Wakefield Trinity beat Batley 9–8 to win the Yorkshire County Cup.

Championship

Championship play-off

Challenge Cup

Oldham beat Hull Kingston Rovers 16-3 in the final played at Leeds before a crowd of 28,335.

This was Oldham’s fifth appearance in the Final and their second win.  Their previous Cup Final win was back in 1899.

During this season's Cup competition, Wigan's Jim Sullivan set a Challenge Cup record for the most goals kicked in a match, when he was successful 22 times against the amateur team, Flimby and Fothergill.

References

Sources
1924-25 Rugby Football League season at wigan.rlfans.com
The Challenge Cup at The Rugby Football League website

1924 in English rugby league
1925 in English rugby league
Northern Rugby Football League seasons